Pierre Bajart (born 9 March 1914, date of death unknown) was a Belgian long-distance runner. He competed in the men's 10,000 metres at the 1936 Summer Olympics.

References

1914 births
Year of death missing
Athletes (track and field) at the 1936 Summer Olympics
Belgian male long-distance runners
Olympic athletes of Belgium
Place of birth missing